Bethlehem Township is one of fourteen townships in Cass County, Indiana. As of the 2010 census, its population was 795.

History
Bethlehem Township was organized in 1836. It was named for an early settler's native hometown of Bethlehem, Pennsylvania.

Geography

Unincorporated towns
 Metea
 Mount Pleasant

Adjacent townships
 Liberty Township, Fulton County (northeast)
 Adams (east)
 Clay (south)
 Noble (southwest)
 Harrison (west)
 Wayne Township, Fulton County (northwest)

Major highways
  Indiana State Road 16
  Indiana State Road 25

References
 
 United States Census Bureau cartographic boundary files

External links

Townships in Cass County, Indiana
Townships in Indiana
Populated places established in 1836
1836 establishments in Indiana